The Southeastern Holiness Institute, also known as Chason's Hospital and as Donalsonville Hospital, was built in 1914.  It was built as a religious educational institution, but was converted in 1918 to a private hospital.  It was listed on the National Register of Historic Places in 1982.

The building was designed by architect Peter E. Dennis in provincial Georgian Revival style.

References

Hospital buildings on the National Register of Historic Places in Georgia (U.S. state)
Colonial Revival architecture in Georgia (U.S. state)
Buildings and structures completed in 1914
National Register of Historic Places in Seminole County, Georgia
Hospitals in Georgia (U.S. state)